Robert Edward Addy (February 1842 – April 9, 1910), nicknamed "The Magnet", was a Canadian right fielder and second baseman in Major League Baseball, whose professional career spanned from  in the National Association to  in the National League. He is credited as the first player to introduce the slide in an organized game, and later attempted to create a game of baseball that would have been played on ice. He is also credited as the first person born in Canada to appear in a major league game.

Career
Born in Port Hope, Ontario, he is credited with employing the first slide in an organized baseball game, while playing for the 1866 Rockford Forest Citys of the National Association of Base Ball Players.  He was still playing for the Forrest Citys in 1869, and was with them two years later when Rockford joined the first all-professional league, the National Association of Professional Base Ball Players.

Rockford lasted just the one season in the Association, and Addy did not rejoin the league until  when he joined the Philadelphia White Stockings. He played in ten games as player-manager, before moving on and joining the Boston Red Stockings later in the season.  He helped the Red Stockings win the league title that year, playing in right field, hitting .355, and finished ninth in the league with a .354 on-base percentage.  On January 20, 1874, the National Association's Judiciary Committee met to discuss, among other things, charges that Addy had joined the Boston Red Stockings before 60 days had elapsed since leaving the Philadelphia club. He was acquitted of the charge and was allowed to play.

He did not play for the Red Stockings in 1874, as he signed to play for the Hartford Dark Blues, but his batting declined to .239, and his on-base percentage dropped to .243.  For the  season, he re-joined the Philadelphia White Stockings, playing in a career high 69 games. He batted .258, and finished ninth in the league with 16 stolen bases. For one game on October 28, 1875, Addy was used as a National Association umpire.

At season's end, the Association folded and was replaced by National League, and Addy joined the Chicago White Stockings. Chicago won the league title that season, with Addy playing 32 games, and hitting .282. Addy moved to his second Major League team in two years, and sixth team in seven years, when he joined the Cincinnati Reds, playing every day in right field, and later took over as the team's manager after Lip Pike quit the position.

Post-career
In a 1900 book, Cap Anson described Addy's playing style, writing, "Bob Addy, who was one of the best of the lot, was a good, hard hustling player, a good base runner and a hard hitter. He was as honest as the day is long... He was an odd sort of a genius and quit the game because he thought he could do better at something else."

Addy later made an unsuccessful attempt to popularize baseball played on ice.  He died at the age of 65 in Pocatello, Idaho, and is interred at Mountain View Cemetery.

See also
List of countries with their first Major League Baseball player
List of Major League Baseball player–managers

Notes

References

Further reading
 Utah State History/Utah Historical Quarterly: Addy, Bob, baseball player, 52: 154–55

External links

1845 births
1910 deaths
Major League Baseball right fielders
Major League Baseball second basemen
Major League Baseball player-managers
19th-century baseball players
Rockford Forest Citys (NABBP) players
Rockford Forest Citys players
Boston Red Stockings players
Philadelphia White Stockings players
Philadelphia White Stockings managers
Hartford Dark Blues players
Chicago White Stockings players
Cincinnati Reds (1876–1879) players
Cincinnati Reds (1876–1880) managers
Baseball people from Ontario
19th-century baseball umpires
Canadian Baseball Hall of Fame inductees